Desperados: Wanted Dead or Alive is a real-time tactics video game developed by Spellbound Entertainment and published by Infogrames for Microsoft Windows.

In the game, the player controls up to six characters in an Old West setting. The protagonist is a worldly knife-fighter and gunslinger, John Cooper, who sets out to capture a notorious train-robber named "El Diablo" and claim the bounty on his head. As Cooper sets off on his quest, he is aided by five other friends and they work together in a real-time, stealth-based structure very similar to that introduced in Commandos: Behind Enemy Lines, although all-out gunfights are still highly possible in the game.

A sequel called Desperados 2: Cooper's Revenge was released in late March 2006. A second sequel, Helldorado (announced as expansion pack Desperados 2: Conspiracy but made into a full game) was released in mid-2007 in Germany. The English version was released in some regions in November 2007.

Spellbound was developing a follow-up with more multiplayer and steampunk-oriented elements, Desperados Gangs,  but they shut down before they could find a publisher.

A fourth entry, Desperados III, was developed by Mimimi Productions and published by THQ Nordic. The game was released for Windows, PlayStation 4 and Xbox One in June 2020.

Plot 
In 1881, an outlaw known only as "El Diablo" and whose face has never been seen by any living soul is responsible for the armed holdup of several trains. The railroad company Twinnings & Co puts up a reward of $15,000 for whoever brings El Diablo in dead or alive. John Cooper, a traveling gunfighter, decides to pursue the bounty despite being warned off by cantankerous U.S. Marshal Jackson, who claims to have an official warrant to capture El Diablo.

Cooper gathers a team of his old acquaintances; ex-prospector and explosives fanatic Sam Williams; Doc McCoy, a physician with hidden talents as a sharpshooter and lockpicker, and gambler and con-woman Kate O'Hara. The group manages to apprehend El Diablo's right-hand man Pablo Sanchez, but as they attempt to deliver him to the authorities, they run into (and thwart) an ambush set by El Diablo's bandits. This and Sanchez revealing that Diablo has an inside man who has been helping him plan the robberies and stay ahead of the law convinces Cooper that Smith, the railroad agent who hired him, is the snitch.

Smith is assassinated before Cooper can get answers, and with Jackson sending a posse to pursue Cooper on charges of murder, he frees Sanchez from prison and enlists his help. Sanchez guides the team to Socorro to track down Carlos, a local who is sheltering El Diablo. Mia Yung, a young Chinese American girl, also joins the team after Jackson's deputies kill her father in his own store, vowing revenge. While Cooper listens in on a conversation between Carlos and one of El Diablo's representatives, Doc and Kate are taken hostage.  

Cooper, Sam, Mia, and Sanchez secretly follow El Diablo's gang as they use a hijacked train to deliver supplies to their boss's hideout in a remote cave. El Diablo captures the group in a trap and imprisons them while he prepares to torture Sanchez to death for betraying him. They escape with the help of Mia's pet monkey, Mr. Leone. Cooper rescues Sanchez and finally confronts El Diablo. To his shock, Diablo reveals that he is actually Marshal Jackson. After a brutal fight, Cooper finishes Diablo off with his knife and collect the reward, making sure that everyone in his gang gets an equal share before they part ways.

Gameplay 
The player can use a "spyglass" function on NPCs to see their fields of vision. Depending on the color of the cone, the player can see the mental state of the NPC. If the cone is green, it means the person is calm. Similarly, a yellow cone signifies suspicion, and a red means the NPC has spotted one of the characters. Some colors signify special status such as a pink cone, meaning the NPC has become attracted to Kate, or a black cone, meaning they have been hit by Mia's blowpipe.

Another special feature is the Quick Action, in which certain actions - from running to a certain place up to using a weapon against a pre-targeted enemy - can be 'pre-programmed' and called upon immediately when needed. For instance, by programming his revolver with Quick Action, Cooper can either concentrate all three shots that he can fire on a single opponent or divide them between up to three targets without having to move the mouse cursor around.

Development 
Physical copies of the game released in the United States featured an alternate cover art by famed comic book artist Glenn Fabry.

An add-on was announced, but it was never released.

A modernised update, Desperados: Wanted Dead or Alive - Modernized, released in July 2018 improved compatibility with newer Windows 10 OS, as well as ports to MacOS and Linux, added foreign dubs that were previously missing from most digital versions, and its mission from the game's demo brought into the full game.

Reception 

Rob Smolka reviewed the PC version of the game for Next Generation, rating it four stars out of five, and stated that "this gets an extra star just for being that rare Western-themes game that does justice to its source. Stick with it through the tough times, or you'll miss out on a great story and a stable full of action".

The game received "generally favorable reviews" according to the review aggregation website Metacritic.

References

External links 
 

2001 video games
Infogrames games
Desperados (video game series)
Linux games
MacOS games
Real-time tactics video games
Single-player video games
Video games developed in Germany
Video games set in Louisiana
Video games set in New Mexico
Video games set in Texas
Western (genre) video games
Windows games
Spellbound Entertainment games